TP-Link Technologies Co., Ltd., is a global manufacturer of computer networking products based in Hong Kong and Shenzhen, China.

History

TP-Link was founded in 1996 by two brothers, Zhao Jianjun ( Zhào Jiànjūn) and Zhao Jiaxing ( Zhào Jiāxīng), to produce and market a network card they had developed. The company name was based on the concept of "twisted pair link" invented by Alexander Graham Bell, a kind of cabling that reduces electromagnetic interference, hence the "TP" in the company name.

TP-Link began its first international expansion in 2005. In 2007, the company moved into its new 100,000-square-meter headquarters and facilities at Shenzhen's Hi-Tech Industry Park. TP-Link USA was established in 2008.

In September 2016, TP-Link unveiled a new logo and slogan, "Reliably Smart"; the new logo is meant to portray the company as being a "lifestyle"-oriented brand as it expands into smart home products.

Product ranges
TP-Link products include high speed cable modems, wireless routers, mobile phones, ADSL, range extenders, routers, switches, IP cameras, power-line adapters, print servers, media converters, wireless adapters, power banks, USB hubs, and smart home devices. TP-Link also manufactured the OnHub router for Google. In 2016 the company launched the new brand Neffos for smart phones. TP-Link manufactures smart home devices under their Kasa Smart and Tapo product lines.

TP-Link sells through multiple sales channels globally, including traditional retailers, online retailers, wholesale distributors, direct market resellers ("DMRs"), value-added resellers ("VARs") and broadband service providers. Its main competition includes companies such as Netgear, Buffalo, Belkin, Linksys, D-Link and ASUS.

Brands

Deco
Deco is a family of mesh-network products. The first of this category was the TP-Link M5, followed up by the M9 Plus which had backhaul compatibility improving on the usable bandwidth in certain cases compared to the M5. At the same time, TP-Link also introduced the Deco P7 which was a power-line connected mesh-network system meaning nodes communicate through the electrical wiring of the domicile compared to the wireless transmissions of the other Deco products. The Deco P7 has since been replaced with the newer Deco P9 which has a different aesthetic but the same wireless performance. Recent products in the series include the Deco M4 and S4 which have the same wireless bandwidth, with only slight differences in design. Further products have been introduced, including the Deco X20 as a new base model, and the Deco X60 as a mid-tier model with higher bandwidth but the same overall design. The Deco X90 is the most powerful of the current Deco family, with more than double the bandwidth compared to the X60 model, and a larger design compared to the other models.

Neffos 

Neffos is a brand operated by TP-Link since 2015, for the production of mobile phones and smartphones.

Tapo
On September 30, 2019, TP-Link launched Tapo with one of its initial offerings being the mini smart Wi-Fi Plug—Tapo P100. The smart plug works over a 2.4 GHz wireless connection and integrates with Amazon Alexa and the Google Assistant. Other offerings from Tapo include a line of home security Wi-Fi cameras  and a line of smart lighting appliances.

Manufacturing
TP-Link is one of the few major wireless networking companies to manufacture its products in-house as opposed to outsourcing to original design manufacturers (ODMs). The company says this control over components and the supply chain is a key competitive differentiator.

References

External links

 

1996 establishments in China
Android (operating system) software
Chinese brands
Companies established in 1996
Home automation companies
IOS software
Manufacturing companies based in Shenzhen
Networking companies
Networking hardware
Networking hardware companies
Privately held companies of China
Routers (computing)
Telecommunication equipment companies of China
Wireless networking